The 2011 Jacksonville State Gamecocks football team represented Jacksonville State University as a member of the Ohio Valley Conference (OVC) during the 2011 NCAA Division I FCS football season. Led by 12th-year head coach Jack Crowe, the Gamecocks compiled an overall record of 7–4 with a mark of 6–2 in conference play, sharing the OVC title with Eastern Kentucky and Tennessee Tech. Despite the conference title, Jacksonville State was not invited to the NCAA Division I Football Championship playoffs. The Gamecocks lost to both Tennessee Tech and Eastern Kentucky. The team played home games at Burgess–Snow Field at JSU Stadium in Jacksonville, Alabama.

Schedule

References

Jacksonville State
Jacksonville State Gamecocks football seasons
Ohio Valley Conference football champion seasons
Jacksonville State Gamecocks football